The 2020 Challenger Series for men's rugby sevens teams was the inaugural season of the second-tier circuit with promotion to the first-tier World Rugby Sevens Series.

The men's tour had sixteen national teams competing and included two Challenger Series events, played in Chile and Uruguay. A final 8-team knockout event had been planned as part of the Hong Kong Sevens tournament to decide the overall winner, but this was postponed and eventually cancelled by World Rugby due to the COVID-19 pandemic.

Japan, as the top-placed team on the standings after the two completed events, was awarded the Challenger Series title and promoted to the World Rugby Sevens Series as a core team for the 2020–21 season.

Teams
There were 16 men's national teams competing in the Challenger Series for 2020.

Tour venues
The official schedule for the 2020 World Rugby Sevens Challenger Series was:

The final qualifying event at the Hong Kong Sevens was originally scheduled to be played in April 2020 but was postponed and eventually cancelled due to the COVID-19 pandemic.

Standings 
The official standings for the 2020 Challenger Series are presented in the table below.

Source: World Rugby

{| class="wikitable" style="font-size:92%; margin-top:25px;"
|-
!colspan=2| Legend 
|-
|style="background:#BBF3BB;"|Green
|Promoted to the 2020–21 World Rugby Sevens Series
|-
|style="background:#ffc;"|Yellow
|Invited team
|}

Notes

Viña del Mar
The first event was held in Chile, hosted at Estadio Sausalito in Viña Del Mar on 15–16 February 2020. Germany won the tournament, defeating Hong Kong by 10–0 in the final, to take the maximum 22 points in the series standings leading into the second event at Montevideo.

All times are CLST, Chile Summer Time: (UTC-3).

Key:  Team advanced to the quarterfinals

Pool A

Pool B

Pool C

Pool D

Lower playoffs

13th place

9th place

Title playoffs

5th place

Cup

Placings

Source: portaldorugby

Montevideo
The men's tour traveled to Uruguay for the second leg. The Seven Punta tournament, the nation's premier international rugby sevens event, served as the Challenge Series contest. Played since 1989 at the resort city of Punta del Este, the tournament was  relocated for the first time to Montevideo for the 2020 edition but kept the Seven Punta name.
It was held at Estadio Charrua on 22–23 February 2020. Japan won the tournament, defeating the host nation Uruguay in the final by 5–0 in extra time.

All times are UYT, Uruguay Time: (UTC-3).

Key:  Team advanced to the quarterfinals

Pool A

Pool B

Pool C

Pool D

Lower playoffs

13th place

9th place

Title playoffs

5th place

Cup

Placings

See also

 2020 World Rugby Sevens Challenger Series – Women's tour

References

External links
Official site

Sevens
Rugby sevens competitions
World Rugby Sevens Challenger Series
World Rugby Sevens
World Rugby Sevens Challenger Series - Men's tour